Fans of X-Rated Entertainment (F.O.X.E., also known as FOXE) is a United States-based pornography fan organization founded by adult film actor, director, and critic William Margold and actress Viper. It advocates against censorship of pornography and gives annual adult film awards.

Awards
The annual FOXE awards ceremony presents three standard awards decided by fan vote: Male Fan Favorite, Female Fan Favorite, and Video Vixen for a new female performer. Additional special awards, including Fan of the Year are presented in some years. In the 1990s, the Fan Favorite awards were often shared but Vixen was always for one recipient. Since the 11th FOXE awards, the ceremony has included a "Broast" (a "benign roast") of a well-known performer who also receives a lifetime achievement award. Any performer winning Fan Favorite three times is "retired" with the FOXE X award, and they become ineligible for further awards. Holders of the FOXE X include Tera Patrick, Nina Hartley, Ashlyn Gere, and Jill Kelly. Ceremony attendance fees go to support anti-censorship causes, like the Protecting Adult Welfare Foundation. The FOXE award winners are decided by a vote from members of FOXE.

1990
The first awards were presented on February 14, 1990 at the XRCO Awards ceremony: 
 Female Fan Favorite: Nina Hartley
 Male Fan Favorite: Peter North

1991
 Vixen: Selena Steele
 Female Fan Favorite: Christy Canyon, Nina Hartley & Tori Welles
 Male Fan Favorite: Tom Byron & Peter North

1992
 Starlet of the Year (Vixen): Teri Weigel
 Female Fan Favorite: Christy Canyon, Ashlyn Gere & Nina Hartley
 Male Fan Favorite: Tom Byron & Peter North

1993
 Video Vixen: Alex Jordan
 Female Fan Favorite: Ashlyn Gere, Hyapatia Lee & Madison
 Male Fan Favorite: Rocco Siffredi & Randy Spears

1994
 Male Fan Favorite: Randy West & Rocco Siffredi
 Female Fan Favorite: Nikki Dial, Ashlyn Gere & Tiffany Mynx
 Vixen: Danyel Cheeks

1995
 Male Fan Favorite: Randy West & Rocco Siffredi
 Vixen: Kylie Ireland
 Female Fan Favorite: Debi Diamond & Leena

1996
 Video Vixen: Jenna Jameson
 Male Fan Favorite: Randy West & Sean Michaels
 Female Fan Favorite: Kylie Ireland, Alicia Rio & Shane

1997
 Male Fan Favorite: T. T. Boy & Sean Michaels
 Female Fan Favorite: Jeanna Fine, Jenna Jameson & Shane
 Vixen: Stephanie Swift

1998
Held at the Mayan Theater in Los Angeles:
 Male Fan Favorite: Sean Michaels & T. T. Boy
 Female Fan Favorite: Jenna Jameson, Stacy Valentine, Tiffany Mynx & Stephanie Swift
Special awards were the "Lady Liberty" award for free speech activist Mara Epstein, the "Friend of F.O.X.E." award for Kitty Foxx, and the "Fan of the Year" for Jay Holnar

1999

 Male Fan Favorite: T. T. Boy & Tom Byron
 Female Fan Favorite: Alisha Klass, Christi Lake & Stacy Valentine
 Vixen: Cherry Mirage

2001
Held on July 8, 2001 at the Mayan Theater with the Mistress of Ceremonies being Christi Lake:
 Male Fan Favorites: Mr. Marcus & Randy Spears
 Female Fan Favorites: Kim Chambers, Bridgette Kerkove & Jill Kelly
 Vixen: Tera Patrick

2002
Date: June 9, 2002
Location: Mayan Theater
Host: Christi Lake
Broast subject: Ron Jeremy

Winners
Male Fan Favorites: Mr. Marcus & Evan Stone
Female Fan Favorites: Tera Patrick, Jill Kelly, & Christi Lake
Vixen: Monica Mayhem
Friend of FOXE: Ron Jeremy

2003
Date: June 21, 2003
Location: Mayflower Ballroom
Host: Bill Margold
Emcee: Christi Lake
Broast subject: Amber Lynn

Winners
Male Performer of the Year: Lexington Steele
Female Performer of the Year: Belladonna & Jill Kelly
Vixen of the Year: Taylor Rain

2004
The 13th awards presentation was held June 17, 2004, in Inglewood, California. Seka was the guest of honor, and Broast subject. Teri Weigel was Mistress of Ceremonies. Tera Patrick won Female Fan Favorite, Mary Carey won the FOXE Vixen award, and Lexington Steele won Male Fan Favorite.

2005

The 14th F.O.X.E. Awards were held on Sunday, February 20, 2005 at the Mayflower Ballroom in Inglewood, California:
 Video Vixen: Teagan Presley
 Male Fan Favorite: Lexington Steele
 Female Fan Favorite: Tera Patrick
Marilyn Chambers was the Broast subject and received a lifetime achievement award.

2006
The 15th award ceremonies were held on Sunday, February 19, 2006:
 Male Fan Favorite: Randy Spears
 Female Fan Favorite: Jesse Jane
 Vixen: Sunny Lane
Randy Spears, Lexington Steele, and Tera Patrick were all formally "retired", after winning three previous FOXE awards. Christy Canyon was the Broast subject.

References
 "Dieter Gone Wild" , Harmon Leon, January 11, 2006, from SF Weekly
 
 "Fans of X-Rated Entertainment (F.O.X.E.) Awards", 2008 Adam Film World Guide Directory, pg. 304

External links

 
 Archived AVN article: "FOXE Awards Showcase Porn’s Past and Future", February 20, 2006

Sex industry
Pornography
Film fan clubs
American pornographic film awards